Jay Mankita is an American singer-songwriter and guitarist.  His original songs integrate elements of blues, bluegrass, ballads, ragtime, swing, and samba, and he also performs old standards.  His work features humor and is often pointed politically, as in his 2004 release "They Lied", which is critical of the George W. Bush administration.  He has recorded several albums, including music for children.

Mankita has also been an actor, photographer, swing dancer, environmental activist, and playwright.

External links
Jay Mankita official site

American country singer-songwriters
American bluegrass guitarists
American male guitarists
American blues guitarists
American folk guitarists
Year of birth missing (living people)
Living people
American male singer-songwriters